Most species of Crataegus (hawthorn) have red fruit, others can have black or purple fruit, and some have yellow or orange fruit.

European and Asian species 
 C. altaica
 C. azarolus, fruit yellow, orange-yellowish, or red
 C. ×bornmuelleri, fruit yellowish, orange, or red
 C. cuneata, fruit can be red or yellow, native to China
 C. dahurica
 C. ferganensis
 C. kansuensis
 C. laevigata cultivar 'François Rigaud'
 C. orientalis var. pojarkovae
 C. ×pseudoazarolus, fruit orange to almost black
 C. pycnoloba, immature red fruit ripen to largely yellow
 C. scabrifolia, fruit can be red or yellow
 C. tanacetifolia
 C. ×tianshanica
 C. tkatschenkoi (syn: C. trilobata V.I.Tkachenko, nom. illeg.)
 C. russanovii
 C. wattiana
 C. zarrei, dark orange fruit

American species 
 C. albicera, series Crus-galli
 C. ambigens, series Silvicolae, fruit "greenish-yellow becoming dark purplish-red"
 C. amica, series Flavae, fruit "orange blotched with red"
 C. amplifica, series Pruinosae, fruit "light yellowish green to dark russet"
 C. anisophylla, series Flavae, fruit orange or orange and red
 C. angulata, series Pruinosae, fruit "light yellowish green becoming dark purplish-red"
 C. annosa, series Apricae, fruit yellow or orange, with red
 C. aprica series Apricae, fruit ripen through a yellow or orange phase before changing to red
 C. arenicola, series Uniflorae, fruit "orange or orange-red"
 C. arta, series Crus-galli, fruit yellow-green and orange-red
 C. attrita, series Flavae, fruit "yellow splashed with red"
 C. audens, series Flavae, fruit "orange-yellow flushed with red"
 C. aurescens, Series Madrenses
 C. austrina, series Pulcherrimae, fruit yellow-green or orange
 C. berberifolia, series Crus-galli, fruit orange or reddish
 C. biltmoreana, series Intricatae, fruit green, yellow, or orange
 C. bisulcata, series Uniflorae
 C. boothiana, series Tenuifoliae, fruit bright orange
 C. boyntonii, series Intricatae, fruit "yellow-green flushed with red"
 C. calva, series Flavae, fruit yellow or orange-red
 C. chrysocarpa, series Rotundifoliae, fruit ripen through a yellow or orange phase before ripening to red
 C. condigna, series Flavae, fruit "red or orange and greenish"
 C. contrita, series Pulcherrimae, fruit green or greenish yellow
 C. cornellii, series Intricatae
 C. crocea, series Flavae, fruit "yellow to russet-red"
 C. crocina, series Crus-galli
 C. croomeana, series Uniflorae,
 C. crus-galli, series Crus-galli, rare forms have yellow fruit,
 C. cullasagensis, series Flavae, fruit "dark orange, mottled with orange-red and crimson"
 C. dapsilis, series Flavae, fruit "yellow or orange and red"
 C. darlingtoniana, series Intricatae
 C. definita, series Intricatae, fruit green or greenish yellow
 C. delosii, series Intricatae, fruit orange tinged with red
 C. diversifolia, series Intricatae, fruit orange
 C. dodgei, series Rotundifoliae, fruit "dull crimson or orange"
 C. dolosa, series Flavae
 C. earlei, series Uniflorae
 C. edura, series Crus-galli
 C. egens, series Flavae, fruit "orange-red or orange and red"
 C. egglestonii, fruit "orange becoming crimson"
 C. flava, series Intricatae, fruit dull orange, a rare species whose name is rarely used correctly
 C. flavida, series Intricatae
 C. fortunata, series Intricatae
 C. furtiva, series Flavae, fruit "orange or orange and red"
 C. galbana, series Apricae, fruit orange to red
 C. geniculata, series Flavae, fruit "lemon-yellow or orange mottled with red"
 C. gilva, series Intricatae
 C. glabrata, series Macracanthae, fruit "crimson blotched with yellow"
 C. gracilior, series Crus-galli
 C. harveyana, series Intricatae, fruit orange
 C. ignava, series Apricae
 C. illudens, series Flavae
 C. incaedua, series Punctatae, fruit "yellowish red"
 C. incana, series Flavae, fruit "orange-yellow or orange and red"
 C. infesta, series Crus-galli
 C. inopina, series Flavae, fruit "yellow or orange-yellow and red"
 C. inops, series Flavae, fruit "orange or orange and red"
 C. intricata, series Intricatae
 C. kelloggii, series Molles
 C. lacrimata, series Flavae, fruit yellow or orange and red"
 C. lecta, series Pruinosae, fruit "light yellow-green becoming red"
 C. leimonia, series Silvicolae, fruit "orange-red blotched with yellow-green"
 C. leonensis, series Apricae, fruit orange-red to russet, or blotched with green
 C. lepida, series Flavae, fruit orange or orange-red
 C. luteola, series Intricatae
 C. margaretta, series Rotundifoliae, fruit "reddish or orange"
 C. meridiana, series Flavae, fruit "orange, yellow, or yellow flushed with red"
 C. mexicana, series Mexicanae C. minutiflora, series Intricatae, fruit "dull orange or orange and green"
 C. mira, series Apricae, fruit orange to red
 C. modesta, series Intricatae, fruit "bright yellow or orange-red"
 C. neofluvialis, series Macracanthae, fruit "greenish orange or flushed with red"
 C. opaca, some cultivars
 C. padifolia, series Intricatae, fruit "yellow flushed with pink, usually pink"
 C. pallens, series Intricatae C. panda, series Flavae, fruit "orange-red or orange tinged with red"
 C. peckii, series Intricatae, fruit "light yellow-green or red tinged"
 C. peramoena, series Macracanthae, fruit "light scarlet blotched with yellow"
 C. pertomentosa, series Macracanthae, fruit "red or yellowish, becoming dark red"
 C. pulcherrima, series Pulcherrimae, fruit yellow-green
 C. pulla, series Flavae, fruit "orange-yellow flushed with red"
 C. punctata var. aurea, series Punctatae C. quaesila, series Flavae, fruit red and orange
 C. radina, series Silvicolae, fruit "yellow-green to dark purplish-red"
 C. raleighensis, series Uniflorae C. rhodella, series Uniflorae, fruit orange and red
 C. rimosa, series Flavae, fruit "yellow or orange-yellow and red"
 C. riparia, series Silvicolae, fruit orange-yellow
 C. rosei subsp. parryana, series Crus-galli, fruit bright yellow
 C. sargentii, series Intricatae C. segnis, series Apricae, fruit orange to red
 C. sicca, series Pruinosae C. siderea, series Tenuifoliae, fruit yellow-green
 C. sinistra, series Crus-galli, fruit reddish, green, or yellow
 C. smithii, series Uniflorae, fruit orange
 C. sororia, series Flavae, fruit red or red and yellow
 C. stonei, series Intricatae, fruit "light yellow or greenish-yellow"
 C. straminea, series Intricatae, fruit yellowish green
 C. stratfordensis, series Macracanthae, fruit "greenish yellow mottled with crimson"
 C. structilis, series Macracanthae, fruit "orange or reddish-orange"
 C. subflavida (possibly the same as C. ignava)
 C. taetrica, series Tenuifoliae, fruit scarlet-yellow
 C. tetrica, series Crus-galli, fruit yellow-green
 C. tenax, series Punctatae, fruit "scarlet or mottled with yellow or olive"
 C. torta, series Pruinosae, fruit "light yellow or russet green"
 C. tripartita, series Virides, fruit yellow-green
 C. villicarpa, series Intricatae, fruit "orange-yellow or tinged with red"
 C. uniflora, series Uniflorae C. vailiae, series Macracanthae, fruit "yellowish-green becoming red"
 C. versuta, series Flavae, fruit "orange or greenish-yellow and red"
 C. viburnifolia, series Molles C. vicana, series Flavae, fruit "yellow or orange blotched with red"
 C. vicenda, series Flavae, fruit "yellow or flushed with red"
 C. villaris, series Flavae, fruit "yellow or orange-yellow flushed with red"
 C. virella, series Pruinosae, fruit "yellowish green blotched with pink, olive, or russet"
 C. visenda, series Apricae, fruit orange to red
 C. vivida, series Coccineae, fruit "dull orange-red blotched with yellow"

 See also 
 List of hawthorn species with black fruit

 Sources 

 Christensen, K.I. 1992. Revision of Crataegus sect. Crataegus and nothosect. Crataeguineae (Rosaceae-Maloideae) in the Old World. Systematic Botany Monographs 35: 1–199.
 Phipps, J.B., and Dvorsky, K.A. 2008. A taxonomic revision of Crataegus series Lacrimatae (Rosaceae). Journal of the Botanical Research Institute of Texas'' 2(2): 1101–1162.

 
hawthorn